Rear Admiral George Hancock (1819 – 20 September 1876) was a Royal Navy officer who went on to be Commander-in-Chief, Pacific Station.

Naval career
Hancock joined the Royal Navy in 1834. As a Commander he was regarded as an innovator in medical matters and insisted that the ship's surgeon had his own cabin. Promoted to Captain in 1855, he was given command of HMS Immortalité, HMS Trafalgar, HMS Duncan and HMS Duke of Wellington. He was appointed Commander-in-Chief, Pacific Station in 1876. He died in this role in September 1876.

References

1819 births
1876 deaths